The RWD 5 was a Polish touring and sports plane of 1931, a two-seat high-wing monoplane, constructed by the RWD team. It was made famous by its transatlantic flight, being the smallest aircraft to cross the Atlantic.

Development
The RWD 5 was constructed by the RWD team of Stanisław Rogalski, Stanisław Wigura and Jerzy Drzewiecki (their designs were named RWD after their initial letters). It was a further development of earlier RWD aircraft series (RWD 1, RWD 2, RWD 3 and RWD 7), especially of its direct predecessor, the RWD 4. It shared the same wing shape and construction, while the fuselage was totally new, constructed of steel frame, unlike its wooden predecessors. The fuselage had a modern shape and a closed canopy with panoramic windows (earlier models had atypical fish-shaped fuselages with no direct forward view from the pilot's seat).

The first prototype (registration SP-AGJ) was flown on 7 August 1931 by its designer Jerzy Drzewiecki. It was built in new workshops of Warsaw University of Technology near Okęcie airport, from 1933 converted to Doświadczalne Warsztaty Lotnicze (DWL) company.

After successes of the prototype in air competitions, a small-scale series production was set up, mostly for the Polish Aero Club. Series aircraft had improved landing gear. Two were built in 1932 (registration SP-AJA and AJB), five in 1933 (including the single-seater RWD 5bis), eleven in 1934 (including one in Aero Club workshops in Lublin) and one more in 1937 (SP-BGX), for a total of 20 aircraft. In 1932, the RWD 5 was shown at the International Air Show in Paris.

Service

RWD 5s were mostly used as trainers and sport planes by Polish regional aero clubs. They scored good results in local competitions, starting from 1931, when the prototype won the 3rd South-Western Poland Flight (pilot M. Pronaszko) and the 4th Domestic Touring Aircraft Contest (pilot Franciszek Żwirko). As sport and touring planes, they were later superseded by the RWD 13, and were relegated mostly for training. Three were written off before 1939.

One aircraft was used by LOT Polish Airlines in 1933–1936 for taxi flights (registration SP-LOT), one by LOPP organization (SP-LOP). After the outbreak of World War II, during the Polish September Campaign, at least three RWD 5 were utilized as liaison aircraft by the Polish Air Force (SP-ALR, ALX, ALZ). Also, Maj. E. Wyrwicki flew RWD 5 from Romania to besieged Warsaw (according to other sources, he flew RWD-5 SP-AJB from Warsaw). None of the RWD 5s survived the war.

One RWD 5 was sold to Brazil in 1938 (former SP-LO, removed from the Polish registry on 4 December 1936) and registered there as PP-TDX in 1939. Its airworthiness expired in 1943.

In late 1990s, a flying replica of the RWD 5, named RWD 5R, was built in Poland by EEA991 association. It flew first on 26 August 2000, and is powered with 140 hp LOM Praha Avia M-332 engine (registration SP-LOT).

The flight across the Atlantic
 
In March 1933 a special single-seater variant was built, called RWD 5bis (registration SP-AJU), powered with 130 hp Gipsy Major engine. The rear cabin was replaced with an additional 300 L (79 US gal) fuel tank, and the windows were removed.

During his travel, on 7 May/8 May, Skarżynski flew the RWD 5bis across the southern Atlantic, from Saint-Louis, Senegal to Maceio in  Brazil. The flight took 20 hours 30 minutes (17 hours above the ocean). He crossed , establishing a distance record in the FAI light tourist plane class. The RWD 5bis was at that time the smallest plane that has ever flown across the Atlantic — its empty weight was below 450 kg (1000 lb), loaded 1100 kg (2425 lb). The plane had no radio nor safety equipment, due to weight. It returned to Europe on a ship. After its record-breaking flight, the RWD 5bis was converted to a two-seater variant without additional tanks, and used by Skarżyński. The SP-AJU was seized by the Soviets in Lwów in September 1939, after their invasion on Poland.

Description
Mixed construction (steel and wood) high-wing cantilever monoplane, conventional in layout. The fuselage of a steel frame, covered with canvas on a wooden frame (with duralumin in engine section). Trapezoid one-part wing, canvas covered (plywood in front), two-spar, with no mechanization. A crew of two, sitting in tandem in a glazed cockpit, with dual controls and individual doors on the right. Conventional fixed landing gear, with a rear skid, wheels in teardrop covers on serial aircraft.

Engine in front, with tractor two-blade wooden propeller of a fixed pitch. A variety of 4-cylinder air-cooled inverted straight engines were used, most typically Cirrus Hermes IIB (105 hp (78 kW) nominal power and 115 hp (86 kW) take-off power). Used also were 130 hp Hermes IV or de Havilland Gipsy III, or 120 hp Walter Junior 4. The RWD 5bis and RWD 5 SP-LOT had a 130 hp (97 kW) de Havilland Gipsy Major.

Specifications (RWD 5)

See also

References

 RWD-5 aircraft Website by Rafał Krok, retrieved on 2008-07-06.

1930s Polish civil utility aircraft
1930s Polish sport aircraft
RWD 05
Single-engined tractor aircraft
High-wing aircraft
Aircraft first flown in 1931